Prince Maximilian of Liechtenstein (Maximilian Nikolaus Maria; born 16 May 1969), known professionally as Max von Liechtenstein, is a member of the Liechtenstein princely family and businessman. He is the second son of Prince Hans-Adam II and Princess Marie.

Education 
After passing his examinations at the Liechtensteinisches Gymnasium  in Vaduz, he studied at the European Business School in Oestrich-Winkel, Germany, and graduated in 1993. In 1998 he completed an MBA degree at Harvard Business School in Boston, Massachusetts.

Career 
Prince Maximilian went to work for Chase Capital Partners (the private equity arm of Chase Manhattan Corporation) in New York City.  After an interval in which he earned his advanced degree in business and was married, he worked for two years for Industrie Kapital. In 2003, he began the management of the German office of JPMorgan Partners.

Since the spring of 2006, he has been the Chief Executive Officer of the LGT Group.  Professionally, he is referred to as Prince Max, rather than Prince Maximilian.

Family 
Prince Maximilian met Angela Brown, a Panamanian-American fashion designer, at a private party in New York in 1997. In 1999, the Principality of Liechtenstein's Information Bureau announced the forthcoming nuptials of Prince Maximilian to Angela Brown. Prince Maximilian married Angela civilly on 21 January 2000 in Vaduz, Liechtenstein, and religiously on 29 January 2000, at 11:00 am, at the Church of St. Vincent Ferrer in New York City.

The marriage brought a person of Afro-Panamanian ancestry into one of the remaining reigning families of Europe. Prince Maximilian obtained prior consent and full support of the sovereign, who also attended the wedding. While some members of the princely house were said to be shocked and to consider the interracial marriage and the eleven years age gap (with Angela being older than Prince Maximilian) "the end of an era", others were said to have expressed support.

Prince Maximilian and Princess Angela have a son:

 Prince Alfons Constantin Maria of Liechtenstein, Count of Rietberg (born on 18 May 2001 in London, England).

Titles, styles and arms

Maximilian is styled as His Serene Highness Prince Maximilian of Liechtenstein, Count of Rietberg. He also bears the coat of arms of the princely house.

References 

1969 births
Living people
Princes of Liechtenstein
Harvard Business School alumni
Liechtenstein Roman Catholics
People from St. Gallen (city)
Sons of monarchs